"The Song of La Palice" (in French: La chanson de la Palisse) is a burlesque song attributed to Bernard de la Monnoye (1641–1728) about alleged feats of French nobleman and military leader Jacques de la Palice (1470–1525).  From that song came the French term lapalissade meaning an utterly obvious truth—i.e. a truism or tautology. When you say something obvious, the interlocutor responds '"So would have said La Palice!" (in French: La Palice en aurait dit autant!).

History of the song
Jacques de la Palice died in the battle of Pavia (1525), while fighting against the Spanish armies as a Marshal under Francis I.  The epitaph on his tombstone reads

Ci-gît le Seigneur de La Palice: S’il n'était pas mort, il ferait encore envie.
("Here lies Sir de la Palice: If he weren't dead, he would be still envied.")

Some sources  claim that the last two verses came from a song that his soldiers composed in his honor, which would have said something along these lines

Apparently the last verse was misread, intentionally or accidentally, as il serait encore en vie ("he would be still alive").  The misreading was due perhaps to the similarity between the lowercase letters "f" and "s" in the calligraphy of the time.  In any case, not many years after the battle (which was a resounding fiasco for the French), a satirical song became widely popular in France, which began like this:

La Palice is not mentioned again in the song.  Between the 16th and the 18th century, the first stanza of this song evolved and multiplied into a great many humorous quatrains, which attributed to Jacques several other similar feats, like his custom to always go in person when eating at his neighbors.  An often-quoted example is

In the early 18th century the French poet Bernard de la Monnoye collected no less than 51 variants, which he joined into a comical song.<ref name="kastner">L. E. Kastner (1929), A Glossary of Colloquial and Popular French for the Use of English Readers and Travellers. 384 pages. Reprinted by Read Books (2007), .</ref>  The song was a success at the time, but was then forgotten until its rediscovery in the 19th century by Edmond de Goncourt.  Edmond is also credited with coining the French noun lapalissade.  The word was eventually was borrowed into Italian as lapalissiano (adj.), and into Portuguese as lapaliçada'' (n.).

However, some sources have a different version: they claim that, somewhere between the 18th and 19th centuries, an unrelated song — originally a parody of the Chanson de Roland — was rewritten to refer to La Palice.

Besides the long version attributed to de Monnoye, there is another version collected by de Lincy

The de la Monnoye version 

This version, allegedly compiled or composed by Bernard de la Monnoye, comes from the French Wikipedia and other sources:

The de Lincy version
These verses are quoted by de Boone from de Lincy:

References

French folk songs
Songs about military officers
Songs about France
Cultural depictions of French men
Comedy songs
French poetry
French songs